Belgrano Athletic Club is an Argentine amateur sports club from Belgrano, Buenos Aires. One of Argentina's oldest institutions still in existence, Belgrano was one of the four clubs that founded the Argentine Rugby Union in 1899. The senior team currently competes at Top 12, the first division of the Unión de Rugby de Buenos Aires league system.

Belgrano Athletic was one of the most prominent teams during the first years of football in Argentina, having won three domestic league titles, one national cup and two international cups. Belgrano's arch-rival during those years was Alumni, also from Belgrano neighborhood. Belgrano disaffiliated from the Argentine Association in late 1910s, focusing on rugby union and other sports. Football is no longer practised at the club.

Belgrano's field hockey team currently takes part of Metropolitano championships organised by the Buenos Aires Hockey Association.

The club's facilities are divided between two locations: its main building (Sede Virrey del Pino) sited in Belgrano and another one located in Pilar (Anexo Pinazo).

Apart from the sports mentioned above, several activities are practised at the club nowadays, such as bowls, contract bridge, cricket, squash, swimming, and tennis.

History

The beginning: Football

There are records of a football match played by the members of the "Club Inglés de Belgrano" in 1894, where Belgrano Athletic Club was officially founded on 17 August 1896.

Belgrano AC participated in the Primera División from 1896 to 1916. The squad won three league titles in 1899, 1904 and 1908, and also won a number of other tournaments including domestic cup Copa de Honor and international competitions Tie Cup (in 1900) and Copa de Honor Cousenier (1907).

Belgrano Athletic played one of the earliest football rivalries against Belgrano neighbours Alumni, the most successful team of Argentine until its dissolution in 1911. Both teams were so strong that they won all of the thirteen league titles contested between 1899 and 1911 (that was the last year of Alumni football team competing in Argentine league, being officially dissolved in 1913).

Belgrano AC would achieve a historic victory over River Plate, defeating the Millonario 10–1 in 1912. That was the worst defeat of River Plate in club's history.

Despite being one of the most notable football teams during the first years of that sport in Argentina, Belgrano was relegated from the Argentine Primera División, along with Quilmes in 1916.

Belgrano never returned to the first division, and the club later disaffiliated from the Argentine Association, focusing on the practise of other sports, mainly rugby union.

Rugby union

Belgrano Athletic rugby union team is one of the most successful teams in the Unión de Rugby de Buenos Aires, having won a total of 10 provincial titles. In 1899, along with club Buenos Aires, Lomas, Flores and Rosario AC, Belgrano became a founding member of the "River Plate Rugby Championship", the origin of today's Argentine Rugby Union.

The first title obtained in rugby union was in 1907, playing 16 matches with 13 victories, 1 drew and only 2 lost. The team scored 233 points and only received 29 at the end of the tournament. That same year the club built the stadium's grandstands (commonly made of woods by the time) with a capacity of 600. In 1909 the Government of Argentina approved the statute (rules) of the club.
Its main rivals are Belgrano district's other big club, Alumni. In 2016, Belgrano won its 11° URBA championship after 48 years without league titles. Belgrano defeated former champion Hindú at the final, played in San Isidro.

Cricket

The first recorded cricket match held on the clubs cricket ground came when the Northern Suburbs and the Marylebone Cricket Club in 1912. First-class cricket was first played there in 1927 when Argentina played the Marylebone Cricket Club. Five further first-class matches were played there, the last of which saw Argentina play Sir TEW Brinckman's XI in 1938. Still in use to the present day, the ground held matches in the South American Championships and the Americas Championships in recent times, as well as hosting matches in the 2009 ICC World Cricket League Division Three. In February–March 2023, the ground played host to three Twenty20 International matches in the 2023 ICC Men's T20 World Cup Americas Qualifier Sub-regional Qualifier.

Records

Twenty20 International
 Highest team total: 226 for 4 (20 overs) by Bermuda v Argentina, 2022/23
 Lowest team total: 110 for 9 (20 overs) by Argentina v Bermuda, as above
 Highest individual innings: 103 by Kamau Leverock for Bermuda v Argentina, as above
 Best bowling in an innings: 4-11 by Delray Rawlins, as above

First-class
 Highest team total: 426 all out by Sir J. Cahn's XI v Argentina, 1929/30
 Lowest team total: 101 all out by Argentina v Marylebone Cricket Club, 1926/27
 Highest individual innings: 162 by Bob Wyatt for Sir T. E. W. Brinckman's XI v Argentina, 1937/38
 Best bowling in an innings: 7-108 by Jim Sims, as above
 Best bowling in a match: 12-174 by Jim Sims, as above

Uniform evolution
It is believed that the first Belgrano A.C. football squad wore black (or dark grey) and gold shirts, as they were depicted in early team photos. In 1907 the club adopted the Central Argentine Railway corporate colors (red, green and silver) as most of the club members were employees of that company. In 1919 Belgrano A.C. changed its colors again, adopting the brown (specifying "chocolate" tone according to the statute of that time) and gold as the railway had changed its colors shortly before.

Football

Rugby union 

Notes:

Venue 
Belgrano's home venue (popularly known as "Virrey del Pino" because of its location on Virrey del Pino and Superí streets in Belgrano) host rugby and cricket match. After some time playing on Pampa and Melián streets, the club acquired that land in 1902 to two of its members, Charles Dickinson (who was also a notable footballer of the club) and Roberts.

The first grandstands were built with wood from surplus railway material. By 1910, the field had an official grandstand, with roof, named "Donald Forester", which has remained up to present days.

Honours

Cricket
Primera División (41): 1902–03, 1905–06, 1906–07, 1907–08, 1908–09, 1910–11, 1911–12, 1914–15, 1918–19, 1923–24, 1925–26, 1926–27, 1928–29, 1929–30, 1931–32, 1932–33, 1953–54, 1954–55, 1955–56, 1958–59, 1961–62, 1965–66, 1967–68, 1968–69, 1969–70, 1970–71, 1973–74, 1974–75, 1980–81, 1981–82, 1983–84, 1984–85, 1988–89, 1989–90, 1991–92, 1997–98, 2001–02, 2005–06, 2010–11, 2013–14, 2015–16

Football

Domestic

 Primera División (3): 1899, 1904, 1908
 Copa de Honor Municipalidad de Buenos Aires (1): 1907
 Segunda División (1): 1902 
 Copa Bullrich (1): 1905

International
Tie Cup (1): 1900
Copa de Honor Cousenier (1): 1907

Rugby union
Torneo de la URBA (11): 1907, 1910, 1914, 1921, 1936, 1940, 1963, 1966, 1967, 1968, 2016

Field hockey
Women's
Metropolitano Primera División (4): 1942, 1946, 1949, 1974

Notable athletes
 Carlos Edgard Dickinson, former football captain that scored the first Argentina national football team goal ever in an official match. It was against Uruguay on 20 July 1902. Argentina won 6–0.
 Arturo Forrester, the first Argentine footballer to score against a British team. It was in the match v Southampton FC, when the English side toured on South America in 1904.
 A.C. Addecott, former football captain.
 Arnold Watson Hutton (1911–13), forward, previously in Alumni, also international with Argentina.
 Jeannette Campbell, silver medalist swimmer at the 1936 Olympics.
 Lisandro Arbizu, former rugby union footballer for Los Pumas.
 Magdalena Aicega, former field hockey captain of Las Leonas.
 Rosario Luchetti, current field hockey player of Las Leonas.

Notes

References

External links

 
 Fans blog (outdated)

Belgrano Athletic Club
B
Rugby clubs established in 1896
Association football clubs established in 1896
B
Field hockey clubs in Buenos Aires
Cricket teams in Argentina
Cricket grounds in Argentina
1896 establishments in Argentina